Lycée français Saint-Louis de Stockholm is a French international school in Stockholm, Sweden. It serves levels maternelle through lycée.

See also

 Svenska Skolan Paris - Swedish school in France

References

External links
 Lycée Français de Stockholm 

International schools in Sweden
Schools in Stockholm
Stockholm